Tămădău Mare is a commune in Călărași County, Muntenia, Romania. It is composed of seven villages: Călăreți, Dârvari, Plumbuita, Săcele, Șeinoiu, Tămădău Mare and Tămădău Mic.

The military airfield located here was the scene of the Tămădău affair, which occurred on July 14, 1947.

References

Communes in Călărași County
Localities in Muntenia